Mauphu is a highly endangered Lolo-Burmese language spoken by about 20 people in Dagulu 大咕噜 village, Guangnan County, Yunnan, China. It is spoken in only one village. Mauphu and Motang are closely related languages.

References

Mondzish languages
Languages of China